The Berkeley Folk Music Festival was a folk music festival held annually from 1958 to 1970 in Berkeley, California, one of the major centers of the folk music revival in the United States. It was directed by Barry Olivier.

The Festival was one of the preeminent folk festivals on the West Coast, predating the more famous Newport Folk Festival on the East Coast and presenting performers, artists, and scholars such as Joan Baez, Pete Seeger, Doc Watson, Alan Lomax, Howlin' Wolf, Phil Ochs, Alice Stuart, Jean Ritchie, Jean Redpath, Jesse Fuller, Big Mama Thornton, Mance Lipscomb, Mississippi John Hurt, Archie Green, Alan Dundes, Bess Lomax Hawes, Ewan MacColl, John Fahey, Robbie Basho, the Jefferson Airplane, the Youngbloods, Big Brother and the Holding Company, Rabbi Shlomo Carlebach, and many others. The festival's willingness to embrace electric rock music and other forms of what would become known as roots music or Americana makes it markedly different from Newport, with its famous struggle over Bob Dylan going electric. It exemplified the diverse and adventurous musical and cultural milieu of the West Coast—and the Bay Area in particular—and suggests a major revision in our understanding of the folk revival, of the relationship of culture to political events in Berkeley such as the Free Speech Movement, to commerce and civil society, and to ongoing issues and questions about cultural heritage, technology, diversity, and commonality.

References

External links
 The Berkeley Folk Music Festival 1958-1970 Archive at Northwestern University

Culture of Berkeley, California
History of Berkeley, California
Festivals in the San Francisco Bay Area
Folk festivals in the United States